Luis Alfredo Garavito Cubillos (born 25 January 1957), also known as La Bestia ("The Beast") or Tribilin ("Goofy") is a Colombian serial killer, sex offender, pedophile, and necrophile. In October 1999, he confessed to committing the rape, torture, mutilation and murder of 147 minors, predominately young men and boys in the western Colombian region.

Beginning a series of torture-rapes on minors aged 6 to 16 in the autumn of 1980, Garavito was estimated to have raped and tortured a minimum of 200 minors, before committing the rape, torture, mutilation and murder of an additional 189 minors in Colombia from 4 October 1992 to 21 April 1999, and a further 4 murders in Ecuador during the summer of 1998.

Apprehended on 22 April 1999 for the attempted rape of 12-year-old John Iván Sabogal, Garavito was held under suspicion for several months until confession on 28 October 1999. The judicial body ruled that all Garavito's sentences total 1,853 years and 9 days in jail. Between his Colombian and Ecuadorian victims, Garavito is confirmed to have murdered at least 193 minors in total, making him the most prolific serial killer in modern history. If his 2003 confession is to be believed, his murders of 23 minors and 5 adults would raise his murder victim count to 221.

Background

Childhood 
Luis Alfredo Garavito Cubillos was born in Génova, Quindío, on 25 January 1957 to Manuel Antonio Garavito and Rosa Delia Cubillos. The eldest son and second child of seven siblings, he had three brothers and three sisters. Garavito alleged his father to be adulterous, drunken, macho, very strict, and often physically and emotionally abusive to him throughout his childhood, and further described his mother as a violent woman who showed him little affection and care as a child. Due to the ongoing armed conflict in Colombia at the time, the family relocated to Ceilán, Valle del Cauca in the north of the department before Garavito entered primary school.

As a result of his father's drinking and extramarital affairs and his mother's aggressive temperament, they frequently fought verbally and physically in the presence of their children, whom they largely neglected. Later remarking that he "had the misfortune of being in a family that spent its time arguing, fighting, and throwing words of great calibre", he recalled being strapped to a tree at age six or seven and beaten with a machete case by his father after attempting to defend his mother, whom Manuel was known to beat in pregnancy. Because of the spontaneous nature of the physical abuse, the children often hid upon their father's return home from work. Sleeping in the same bed as his father, Garavito also alleged he may have been fondled on one occasion from a vague memory.

Garavito was belittled as an imbecile, a bastard, and other pejoratives by his father, whom he claimed "never had a good word" for him, solely bringing his son with him for work-related purposes and to run errands. Attending Simón Bolívar School in Ceilán, he was reportedly enthusiastic, collaborative, and cheerful but gradually became shy and reserved, immediately becoming the recipient of frequent ridicule among classmates. Garavito's teachers noted his desire to learn conflicted with his extreme frustration with an inability to understand subjects. Nicknamed "Garabato" (meaning "Squiggle") for his glasses and timid nature by peers, Garavito was insecure of his glasses and eventually preferred playing alone at recess, developing an inferiority complex and reacting violently in response to frequent taunting by students, who chased and mocked him by screaming "Squiggle". Despite the frequent ostracizing and aggressive conflicts, his teachers made no attempts to stop the bullying. This distressed Garavito, who accumulated resentment toward his belittling father and envy toward peers from stable homes.

Around 1968, he left school in fifth grade due to poor memory and his father's insistence on making money to sustain the family. This dismayed Garavito, who was also forbidden to have friends or a girlfriend by his father. Shortly thereafter in 1969, Garavito was subject to extensive physical and sexual abuse by a local drug-store owner and neighbor on his father's visits to the store for Garavito's vaccinations. The neighbor—who was a close friend of his father's—had allegedly bound Garavito to a bed before sexually assaulting him and proceeding to burn him with a candle, cut him with a razor blade, and bite his genitals and buttocks on several occasions during these incidents of molestation. Following the first incident of this abuse, Garavito allegedly killed and dissected two birds in frustration, which prompted him to feel remorse and shame shortly thereafter.

Adolescence 

After stoning the birds, Garavito began suggesting to his younger brothers and sisters that they sleep with him naked in their shared bed. He then sexually fondled his younger siblings as they slept on multiple occasions after removing their clothes. Garavito also alleged he molested a 6-year-old boy. According to those who knew him, Garavito became very withdrawn, extremely aggressive, and "ready to take revenge on the world."

The neighbor's sexual abuse—which rendered him sexually impotent and permanently unable to ejaculate properly—ended after the family's relocation to Trujillo in 1971. Believing that his father and family would not feel concern or believe him, Garavito chose to hide his sexual abuse experiences. Soon after arriving in Trujillo, he was shown heterosexual pornography by another neighboring family friend. Because Garavito responded with disgust, the neighbor beat him into the undergrowth before raping him. In 1972, Garavito aggressively and repeatedly attempted to initiate sexual relations with women as a 15-year-old youth, but his advances toward them were consistently rejected.

Through various alcoholic family members, Garavito accessed alcoholic drink and developed an addiction. A rebellious young man, Garavito was briefly evicted in 1972 after being caught by his mother attempting to rape a 5-year-old boy and again in 1973 following an attempted sexual assault on a 6-year-old boy at a train station in Bogotá. The boy screamed, which alerted authorities to arrest Garavito, who stated he only wanted to "lightly" molest the child in response to an attempted rape charge. Following the latter incident, Garavito was reprimanded by his father Manuel for not choosing a woman to sexually assault instead of a young boy. With Garavito's homosexuality causing frequent arguments between him and his father Manuel, he was evicted for the final time for "homosexual behavior".

As a young man, Garavito started working as an assistant at a compensation fund and later in a chain of stores, and studying in marketing. Despite his new-found career, he began to have problems with his co-workers, clients and bosses which gradually escalated to physical altercations. After losing his job, Garavito worked as a street vendor who sold religious icons and a migrant worker, developing primarily platonic relationships with various women over the course of his adulthood. In 1973, he began work on a coffee plantation as a youth in Trujillo, first falling in love with a schoolteacher and single mother named Luz Mary Ocampo Orozco whom he later attended weekly mass services with. 

Many of the women he befriended had children, whom Garavito reportedly nurtured as if they were his own children, in addition to being a loving boyfriend when sober. His companions likewise described him to be amicable despite his notably violent temper and occasional drunken states in which he vowed to murder his father. While drunk, Garavito—an increasingly jealous and controlling partner in relationships—was also prone to physically abusing his girlfriends over insignificant problems, if there were any at all. As a result, he often found himself the subject of town gossip and frequent evictions by his female partners in later life.

Adulthood

1970s 
Garavito suffered symptoms of psychosis, paranoia and depression, and began compulsively molesting both male and female children, developing an almost exclusive preference for pubescent boys. Due to depression and suicidal feelings related to his lack of achievement, he expressed desire to start a family. Insisting on having sexual intercourse with female partners when drunk however, he consistently failed to maintain an erection, prompting an unprovoked emotional rant concerning his hatred for his family.

Garavito gradually developed alcoholism, and began participating in Alcoholics Anonymous meetings in 1978. Garavito also converted to the Pentecostal faith and worked as a store clerk, where he had again met his first girlfriend Luz Mary. Drifting from his family, he was only close to his older sister, Esther, who avoided him due to his alcoholism. Garavito also held resentment toward younger siblings for defending their father, who he felt had largely favoured them in childhood. Relocating to the town of Armenia, Garavito acquired a new job at a local bakery. Following his frequent attendance of local church services in which he remorsefully beat his chest during prayer, Garavito attended Alcoholics Anonymous meetings and occasionally visited psychiatrists before ending his day by frequenting Valencia Park to procure the services of child prostitutes.

1980s 

After allegedly provoking a fight with his co-workers, Garavito's employment at the bakery was terminated; he subsequently attempted suicide. Following this failed attempt, Garavito sought psychiatric care at the San Juan de Dios hospital and was repeatedly hospitalized throughout the spring of 1980, where he expressed a desire to die over a belief that his life "was worth nothing."  He was primarily treated for his diagnosed depression in spite of evident psychosis and bulimia; he was, however, prescribed antipsychotic medication. Intent on being truthful with the psychiatrist, Garavito stated he wanted to have children, before misdirecting this statement into implying he wanted to start a family. Fearful of consequences, Garavito chose not to inform the psychiatrist of his pedophilia or his sexual impotence with female partners.

Garavito later obtained employment in 1980 at a supermarket in Armenia, being given 2-hour lunch breaks on Thursday and Sunday afternoons. He then began a short-lived relationship with a single mother and beautician named Claudia, whom he described as being the first woman whose company he enjoyed. Claudia soon left Garavito as he apparently could not sustain Claudia's spending habits. Satisfying his sexual desires by binding and raping children during his lunch breaks in neighboring Quimbaya and Calarcá, the couple did not engage in intercourse. During this period, Garavito emphasized constant urges to molest children he encountered at work. In the autumn of 1980, he began carrying razor blades, candles, and lighters to facilitate the torture of his victims. In addition, Garavito removed a tooth to be able to bite children more effectively.

Following his crimes, he wrote the name of the molested child in a blue notebook and prayed for them while pacing his room, fervently beating his chest while naked in a ritual-like fashion. Garavito also began compulsively reading the Bible each night, attempting to find an explanation in the Book of Psalms for his deviance. Despite this, Garavito developed an avid interest in esoteric study, tarot readings and Satanism. He would visit palm readers and other occultic practitioners before concluding they also knew little regarding the occult. Afflicted with bouts of depression and guilt from his crimes, Garavito suffered nightmares about his victims, waking up in tears before entering fits of hysterical laughter as he remembered the pleasure received from their pain. 

Discovering Adolf Hitler's book Mein Kampf, Garavito became fond of Hitler upon discovering similarities in their early lives, homosexual experiences, and years spent in vagrancy. This fondness developed into idolization, expressing admiration for Hitler, mass graves of the Holocaust, and stating that he "liked the concentration camps". On 25 January 1984, Garavito was housed under psychiatric care for 33 days following a mental breakdown; he was prescribed antipsychotic medication and referred to psychotherapy for his depression. After obtaining a permit to leave on 28 February 1984, Garavito fled to Pereira where he immediately molested, burned, and bit two children in the sector of Getsemani before leaving their photographs with his older sister. When the children publicly identified him, Garavito fled the city. He then resumed storing scalpels, candles, and razor blades in plastic bags for future victims. Having molested and tortured more than a hundred children by this period, Garavito was briefly detained for stealing jewelry from a friend.

Garavito also developed an obsession with Colombian spree killer Campo Elías Delgado, who murdered his own mother and several others at a Bogotá restaurant in December 1986. Garavito admired the national attention it received and wished to emulate him as he and others noted it on television at a bar. From this point on, Garavito harboured extensive fantasies of acquiring a machine gun and annihilating his father and family before committing suicide. Holding various murderers in great admiration, Garavito felt that committing suicide following a mass murder of his family would be an ideal way to die for him.

During this period, Garavito found another girlfriend named Graciela Zabaleta, a single mother who resided near the local psychiatric centres in which he was committed. After introducing himself, Garavito casually suggested that she be his permanent companion. Charmed by his confidence, Zabaleta let Garavito live with her in exchange for providing meals and paying bills in their Pereira household. Garavito was generally absent, but acted as a protective and fatherly figure over the household. Despite this, Zabaleta was wary of Garavito's alcoholism, which often spurred scandalous and antisocial behaviour. Like Luz Mary, Garavito also would later claim to have loved Zabaleta.

After being seen drunk in the company of various pubescent youths of "humble" appearance by his friends Jairo Toro and Ancizar Valencia, Garavito's companions became aware of their friend's pederasty. Despite this, Garavito was not confronted, and most of his male and female acquaintances did not suspect any sexual problems. Starting in 1988, Garavito began documenting his crimes, keeping trophies from his victims in black cloth suitcases at several females' residences.

1990s 

Between 1980 and 1992, Garavito was estimated to have raped and tortured a minimum of 200 youths, a period during which he had actively spent five years under psychiatric care, having attempted suicide several times. Wherever Garavito had resided during this time, reports of child molestation in said areas increased dramatically.

While operating an ouija board, Garavito alleged that he entered a state of psychosis in which the devil had asked whether he would like to serve him. Answering that he would, the devil responded, saying, "Kill, that with killing many things may come." Attempting to commit his first murder on 1 October 1992 Garavito sought a young boy who had been selling sweets and cigars to passersby. In a "state of drunkenness," he lured the youth—who he planned on bringing to a wooded lot—to the Melia hotel sector in Bolivar, Colombia before being interrupted and beaten by local police, one of whom hit him over the head with a revolver. As Garavito bled, they then stole 100,000 pesos, a watch, and a ring from him before letting him go from a police station. Garavito then resolved to commit murder three days later.

Committing his first murder of a boy named Juan Carlos on 4 October 1992, Garavito began wearing various disguises in order to evade identification and arrest. Known locally as "Goofy," a generous man who gave to children in Trujillo, locals went out of their way to keep documents for Garavito. For years, Garavito documented his crimes by tickets, receipts, clothes, and identity cards of victims in a black cloth suitcase; Garavito left the suitcase with his sister Esther before giving it to Luz Mary. He also collected their amputated toes, before disposing of them for fear that the Colombian National Police's scent dog team may trace them to him. In June 1996, Garavito complained to Luz Mary of losing his temporary job as a salesman for air fresheners, begging for a place to stay in exchange for food and financial relief. Wary of Garavito for his alcoholism and temper, she took him in briefly with hesitance; Garavito then suffered a hard fall in the Guacamayas neighborhood of Bogotá, breaking his leg in August 1996. Stricken with pain, he resided temporarily with a man before begging his girlfriend Luz Mary to let him stay at her residence again. Restricted by having to use crutches, wear a neck brace, and a cast, Garavito resorted to begging on the street for the two months he resided with her.

Garavito provided for the household by paying for meals and other means, such as bringing a television. He remained hostile, however and entered a fight with his girlfriend's 15-year-old son for wanting to watch the local news. Luz Mary subsequently evicted Garavito, who derided her son as disrespectful and rude, and had also damaged a gold chain she had gifted to him. Later that year on Christmas Day, Luz Mary received a gift from a visiting friend, which prompted an angry, drunken phone call from Garavito who stated that he "didn't like those faggots" visiting as he feared they would steal her generosity from Garavito. After being informed he was no longer welcome, Garavito appeared the next morning shouting obscenities and threats while grabbing at Luz Mary's throat, prompting her and the family to hide at a neighbor's house. After several hours, Garavito left an apology note asking for her forgiveness, and noting his "damage" to their household. Nicknamed "Conflict" by locals, Garavito was frequently seen drunk and drifting from town to town as he outwore his welcome, often due to his domestic disputes with co-workers, abuse of his girlfriends, and general inability to behave normally. His erratic behavior reportedly left him unable to develop meaningful relationships, despite living with two different women in Pereira at the time of his arrest.

Toward the end of Garavito's crime spree, he drifted through western Colombia as a homeless drifter. Weary of murdering minors who he felt were much too easy to lure, Garavito developed plans to eventually commit a mass murder in which he would kidnap several adults and murder them as he attracted the attention of journalists, possibly dying in the frenzy. Nevertheless, Garavito was detained for the attempted sexual assault of 12-year-old John Iván Sabogal before being able to perform this mass murder on 22 April 1999.

Murders 
A prolific pederast and torturer of youths, Garavito began to feel apathy with his crimes. On 4 October 1992, he had spotted 13-year-old boy Juan Carlos walking near a bazaar he had been drinking at. According to Garavito, the reflection of the moonlight had invoked a "strange force" within him, reminding him of his childhood  which compelled him to murder upon entering a state of rage. He began to follow the child, buying synthetic rope and a butcher knife on the way, before offering him work for 500 or 1,000 pesos. The boy left the crowded area in Jamundí with Garavito to go to a remote area near the local railroad, where he was later found with his front teeth knocked out, severe cuts to his rectum and throat and his genitals severed. Waking upon sunrise, Garavito began sobbing as he noted the blood stains of Carlos on his clothes.

On 10 October 1992, Garavito would make the trip to Trujillo to see his sister Esther. Attempting to control his urges by drinking brandy, he began breaking containers in a state of rage after seeing a child pass by. Garavito then murdered 12-year-old Jhon Alexander Peñaranda on the way to his sister's residence while in Tuluá. He then began to compulsively murder youth, predominately male and poverty-stricken, and collected their amputated toes. In 1993, Garavito also began cutting into his victims' bellies, luring eight youths aged 9 to 11 from a local school to a nearby wooded lot in the La Victoria district. For fear of being traced by bloodhounds, Garavito then discarded their amputated toes before murdering Henry Giovanni García, Marco Aurelio Castaño, Juan David Cárdenas, Jaime Orlando Popayán, and three more unidentified children in southeast Bogotá. He then murdered two additional children in the Meissen neighborhood, before departing for Tuluá, to Pereira, to Quimbaya, then to Tuluá again where he murdered more children, ending his spree in 1993 with the death of 13-year-old Mauricio Monedero Mejía.

In early 1994, Garavito would lure a Bogotá youth—estimated to be about 12 years old—who had fallen asleep on the bus. After providing him with brandy, Garavito proceeded to strip and bind the boy at a secluded ravine spot in a dazed state before noticing a foul odour; he then let the child go after discovering the source of the odour was a mass grave. Immediately, the child seized the knife, severing Garavito's tendons in his left hand with the weapon before being overpowered and murdered by him. On 4 February 1994, Garavito would lure 13-year-old Jaime Andrés González from the Plaza de Bolívar to a sugarcane field shortly after being expelled from a bar that night for complaining of their food; noting a crucifix in the area, he entered a brief psychosis in which he buried his knife, prayed for forgiveness, retrieved the knife and returned to his hotel room to chant scripture from the fifty-seventh psalm for several hours until dawn. On 12 January 1997, Garavito murdered an 8-year-old boy, before murdering an additional two minors during this period.

The victims were almost exclusively boys, though Garavito has also been noted by local media to have molested and murdered female victims. In addition to his 172 initial charges of murder, Garavito also confessed to 28 more murders in 2003, of which 5 were adult. All adult victims were thought to have been killed to rid Garavito of potential witnesses rather than to fulfill personal fantasy.

Murders abroad 

Garavito was also said to have operated in Ecuador during the summer of 1998, when he murdered 14-year-old Abel Gustavo Loor Vélez, a local shoe-shiner and paper boy on 20 July 1998 and 12-year-old Jimmy Leonardo Palacios Anchundia in Chone, Ecuador. Both boys were from poor families, and disappeared at noon. Garavito was subsequently spotted at an all-girls' school in Santo Domingo, Ecuador before fleeing Ecuadorian authorities who had been setting up an operation to catch him. There they found two corpses, one of whom was a young girl who had been raped, tortured, murdered, and discarded in similar fashion to that of Garavito's modus operandi. Marked for his thick Colombian accent, locals spotted a foreign drifter begging for money in July and August of that year. In addition, Garavito also stated that he had allegedly committed murder in Venezuela.

Surviving victims

William Trujillo 
In 1979, Garavito, wielding a machete, seized victim 9-year-old William Trujillo Mora (who was interviewed and featured on the Colombian television program Los Informantes) in the Valle del Cauca region as he was about to join other playing children, hugging him and threatening to kill him if he screamed. Mora obliged, and he was escorted by Garavito to an abandoned building where he was sexually molested and tortured for 12 hours. When Garavito sensed that someone was near the house, he urged the child to remain silent. When Garavito lost consciousness from drinking, Mora managed to escape.

Unidentified youth 
In 1988, Garavito lured an unidentified victim who he had sexually assaulted near a restaurant called El Arepazo in the Alto del Río sector, in Quindío's Calarcá, a location where several bodies were later found within a 20-metre proximity of one another. Following an earthquake on 25 January 1999 authorities found the owner of the restaurant—which was reduced to rubble—who pointed them to Garavito, whom he had known for many years and avoided due to his drinking problem and aggressive tendencies.

Carlos Alberto 
In the early 1990s, Garavito would approach 10-year-old Carlos Alberto in the Circasia sector of Quindío. Offering him gifts and 200 pesos in exchange for work, Garavito led Carlos to the Alto de la Taza where he amicably spoke with the child. Upon reaching a secluded hill spot, Garavito placed a knife at Carlos' throat before proceeding to bind, rape, and torture him. After doing so, Garavito asked Carlos whether he enjoyed it. Humiliated and fearful of Garavito, Carlos stated that he liked it, prompting Garavito to leave after stating, "See you next week. That's how I like it, that you [also] like it."

Brand Ferney Bernal Álvarez 
Brand Ferney Bernal Álvarez was a 16-year-old youth who worked with his father in the rooster fighting business in the 1990s. While Bernal Álvarez tended to roosters in the cockpit, Garavito took him to a secluded spot by threatening him with a knife. He then proceeded to bind, sexually assault and torture Bernal Álvarez, with methods ranging from stabbing Bernal Álvarez seven times with a screwdriver as he raped him, to beating the youth until weak. Bernal Álvarez broke free from his restraints and fled from Garavito.

Modus operandi 

According to Garavito, he primarily targeted children of humble background who were working class, homeless, peasants or orphaned. Claiming to feel a force within that compelled him to kill, Garavito would look for children and lure them away by bribing them with small gifts such as money, candy or odd jobs. He typically abused children with fair complexion and light-coloured eyes. Born and raised in the largely Spanish-descended Paisa region of Colombia, he knew where to find victims that fit his criteria.

Terrified of the dark, he would approach them in broad daylight in public places ranging from the countryside to crowded city streets. Garavito also drank brandy near school zones on evenings to wait for unknowing children. He offered easy work for money and even disguised himself as various characters ranging from a Catholic priest, to a schoolteacher, to an elderly man to more effectively lure victims. To prevent suspicions about his activities from developing, Garavito would change his disguise often.

Once he had the trust of a child, Garavito typically walked to a secluded spot or mass grave site with the victim, encouraging them to talk about their personal life until they were tired and vulnerable, which then made them easy to handle. After sipping about half a bottle of brandy, Garavito bound the children, intimidating them with a knife as he fondled and sometimes masturbated over them. According to Garavito, he made a "pact with the devil" and Satanic rituals were also incorporated into the murders of the children, who were apparent blood sacrifices.

The children were often molested and tortured simultaneously for prolonged periods, with methods ranging from being stabbed with a screwdriver in the buttocks, hands, and feet to having their buttocks flayed with broken blades that Garavito had placed between his fingers. While alive, the children's genitalia was often severed and placed in the mouth. They were extensively beaten, burned, trampled and often showed deep cuts in the back, belly and throat. In some cases, they were sexually abused as their intestines poured out of their belly, impaled through the anus and out of the mouth, and stabbed over one hundred times.

Garavito's climax would occur when he had decapitated the child alive or cut the throat as he finished before leaving the severed genitals in the mouth of the decapitated head. Necrophilia with the victim's corpse was also occasionally involved in the crimes; sometimes prematurely, as Garavito could only achieve orgasm by beating and stabbing his victims during intercourse. The bodies of the children were all found completely naked, and all bore bite marks and signs of anal penetration. Containers of lubricant were found near the bodies, along with empty bottles of the cheapest brandy in Colombia. Most corpses showed signs of prolonged torture.

Investigation 

Beginning in October 1992, minors between the ages of 6 through 16 began disappearing rapidly from the streets of Colombia. Due to the decades-long civil war, many children in Colombia were impoverished and unlikely to be reported missing. Several women began reporting their children missing, and a group of children discovered a skeleton in Pereira while playing football on 7 November 1998, yet authorities did not take much notice until 15 November, when mass graves of as many as 36 children were uncovered—almost all of them boys—with signs of binding, sexual assault, and prolonged torture. They discovered a total of 41 children in the department of Risaralda, with 27 children discovered in neighboring Valle del Cauca.

This large number of missing children called for a widespread investigation as these killings were not confined to a specific area. The brutality was so fierce to authorities that they initially hypothesized the killings were performed by a Satanic cult or an international child-trafficking ring. In spite of this, the Prosecutor's Office quickly speculated that it was likely one man to be responsible for the killings, due to the prevalence of nylon cord and liquor bottle caps found at all of the crime scenes. On 6 February 1999, outside the town of Palmira, the bodies of two naked children were found lying next to each other on a hill near a sugarcane field. The next day, only meters away, they discovered another child's body. All three bodies had their hands bound and bore signs of sexual abuse. The victims' necks were severely cut and bruises were on their backs, genitals, legs and buttocks. The murder weapon was found in the same area as the bodies. Garavito had passed out partially naked on top of a child's corpse while drunk with a cigarette in his left hand, causing the cane field to catch fire. He burned himself severely in the process and left behind his money, burnt glasses, shorts, shoes, and underwear. Receipts and a note containing Graciela Zabaleta's address was also found.

From his glasses, the authorities were able to determine that the local serial killer was middle-aged and had an astigmatism in his left eye. They falsely arrested a local sex offender named Pedro Pablo Ramirez Garcia, who was 44 and had a limp in his right foot. As two boys disappeared in Pereira, a young boy had outed Garcia as the man who attempted to assault him. He was kept in jail until more children began to disappear in Bogotá. Meanwhile, Aldemar Duran, the main detective, had begun to suspect Garavito as their wanted killer. Garavito's girlfriend was contacted; she told police that she had not seen him in months. She did, however, give to the police a black cloth suitcase that Garavito had left in her possession, which contained a number of his belongings. These items included pictures of young boys, detailed journals of his murders, tally marks of his victims and bills. This new information led them to Garavito's residence, but the property was vacant. Detectives believed that Garavito was either travelling for work or away attempting to find his next victim. Garcia was released after Duran was able to track down the girlfriend and sister of Garavito.

Arrest  
Garavito was picked up by the local police just a few days later on an unrelated charge of attempted rape against 12-year-old John Iván Sabogal. On 22 April 1999, Garavito was drinking brandy in the evening when he encountered Sabogal selling lottery tickets in the city of Villavicencio. Introducing himself as Bonifacio Morera Lizcano, a local politician, Garavito proceeded to seize Sabogal with a knife before threatening the child into silence. Pretending to hug Sabogal, Garavito escorted him into a taxi before forcing him to climb a barbed wire fence that led to a secluded hillside. At this location, Garavito proceeded to bind Sabogal while repeatedly screaming, "Am I a sadist?" He then taunted the child with the blade, shouting various obscenities as he masturbated over him.

A homeless 16-year-old had been close enough to hear the struggle between Garavito and the child. The teen began to curse and throw stones at Garavito. Garavito chased the teenager with his dagger. Both the boy and the teen fled to the Rosa Blanca farmhouse located on La Coralina Road in Villavicencio,  where they were met by a 12-year-old girl. Garavito later reached the farmhouse, aggressively asking the girl for directions. She directed Garavito into the woods, where he became lost. The police were contacted, resulting in a search. Authorities found Garavito walking out of the woods at approximately 7:00 p.m. as they urged angry locals not to get involved in the search. He gave them a false ID and claimed to be the politician Lizcano. Despite this, they suspected the man to be Garavito anyway. On 4 July 1999, their suspicion was confirmed.

For Colombia's Justice Department, Garavito's confession was not enough. Garavito had an eye condition that was rare and only found in men in a particular age group. His glasses were specifically designed for his unique condition. These particular glasses were found at a crime scene. Garavito also left behind bottles of brandy, his underwear and his shoes. DNA was found on the victims, along with the other items left behind. Police scheduled the entire jail where Garavito was being detained to get an eye exam, the outcome of which would help police pair the glasses to Garavito. By making it mandatory for all the prisoners, it reduced Garavito's suspicion and kept him from lying about his eyesight.

While Garavito was out of his cell, detectives took DNA samples from his pillow and living area. The DNA found on the victims was a match to the DNA found in Garavito's cell. Garavito confessed to murdering about 140 children and was charged with killing 172 altogether throughout Colombia. He was found guilty on 138 of the 172 accounts; the others are ongoing. Garavito was sentenced to 1,853 years and 9 days in prison, the lengthiest sentence in Colombian history. However, Colombian law limits imprisonment to 40 years, and, because Garavito helped police find the victims' bodies, his sentence was further reduced to 22 years.

Garavito is currently serving his sentence in a maximum-security prison in Valledupar in the department of El Cesar in Colombia. He is held separately from all other prisoners because it is feared that he would be killed immediately. He will become eligible for parole in 2023 when he has served three fifths of his sentence.

Garavito remains hopeful, having expressed to Colombian senator Carlos Moreno de Caro apparent plans to enter Colombian congress, enter the ministry as a Pentecostal pastor, and marry a woman (in rejection of his self-admitted homosexuality) in the hopes that he will be able to help abused children upon his release. Garavito suffers from severe eye cancer which leaves him weak and fatigued, requiring daily blood transfusions. He spends most of his time making handcuffs, earrings and necklaces in the medical unit of Valledupar's prison.

Public response 
Many Colombians criticized the possibility of Garavito's early release. In recent years, Colombians have increasingly felt that Garavito's sentence was not sufficient punishment for his crimes. Some have argued he deserves either life in prison or the death penalty, neither of which exist in Colombia. Colombian law had no provision or method to impose a sentence longer than what Garavito received, which was seen as a deficiency in the law caused by the failure to address the possibility of a serial killer in Colombian society. The law has since increased the maximum penalty for such crimes to 60 years in prison.

Journalist Guillermo Prieto "Pirry" La Rotta interviewed Garavito for a show which was broadcast on 11 June 2006. Pirry mentioned that, during the interview, Garavito tried to minimize his actions and expressed intent to start a political career in order to help abused children. Pirry also described Garavito's conditions in prison and commented that due to good behavior, he could probably apply for early release within three years.

See also 
 List of serial killers in Colombia
 List of serial killers by number of victims
 Pedro López (serial killer)
 Manuel Octavio Bermúdez

Notes

References

Bibliography 

 

1957 births
Child sexual abuse in Colombia
Colombian murderers of children
Colombian people convicted of murder
Colombian rapists
Colombian serial killers
Crimes involving Satanism or the occult
Human trophy collecting
Living people
Male serial killers
Necrophiles
People convicted of murder by Colombia
People from Quindío Department
People with psychotic disorder